Theaterakademie Mannheim  is a theatre school in Mannheim, Baden-Württemberg, Germany.

Drama schools in Germany
Performing arts education
Universities and colleges in Baden-Württemberg
Buildings and structures in Mannheim